Clinidium pilosum is a species of ground beetle in the subfamily Rhysodinae. It was described by Antoine Henri Grouvelle in 1903. It is known from Mérida state in western Venezuela, possibly extending into adjacent Colombia.

Clinidium pilosum measures  in length.

References

Clinidium
Beetles of South America
Invertebrates of Venezuela
Beetles described in 1903